"Promises" is a song by American hip-hop artist Wiz Khalifa. It features production by Jim Jonsin and serves as the third promotional single off his fifth studio album Blacc Hollywood.

Charts

References 

2014 singles
2014 songs
Wiz Khalifa songs
Atlantic Records singles
Rostrum Records singles